"When the Weather Is Fine" is the fourth and final single released from Australian pop rock band Thirsty Merc's debut album, Thirsty Merc (2004). The song only appears on the 2005 re-packaged version of the album.

Music video
The music video features Thirsty Merc playing the song in a theatre and there's water shallowly covering the stage (to ankle height) intercut with scenes from the audience where a young man and woman appear to be having relationship troubles, reflecting the lyrical content of the song.

Track listing
Australian CD single
 "When the Weather Is Fine" – 3:24
 "Baby Tell Me I'm the Only One" – 3:25
 "Crystal Striker" – 3:51
 "Someday, Someday" (video)
 "Wasting Time" (video)

Charts

References

Songs about weather
Thirsty Merc songs
2005 singles
2005 songs
Songs written by Rai Thistlethwayte
Warner Music Australasia singles